Cornish Canadians are Canadians of Cornish descent, including those who were born in Cornwall. The number of Canadian citizens of Cornish descent cannot be determined through census statistics, though speculative estimates place the population as high as 20,000.

History

Early arrivals
It is recorded that the first Cornish to reach what is now Canadian soil did in the 16th century, reaching the coast of Newfoundland, part of the province of Newfoundland and Labrador.

Bruce Mines

Cornish emigrants settled the area around Bruce Mines starting in 1842. Located on the north shore of Lake Huron, the area had been associated with the native copper used by indigenous people, whose copper working in the upper Great Lakes dates back to the Old Copper complex. With the spread of knowledge of copper in the area among Europeans, a copper mine opened in 1846, with many local Cornish settlers being recruited to work there. This was the first copper mine in Canada.

Around this time, there was a depression in the Cornish mining industry, which contributed to the volume of people participating in the Cornish "Great Migration", the outflow of emigrants primarily to English-speaking colonies such as Canada and Australia. In 1848, a barque carrying fifty Cornish emigrants, mostly from the Hayle area, along with a stationary steam engine (built in a foundry at Copperhouse) and assortment of Cornish ore processing equipment, left the Port of Hayle bound for Montreal. The arrival of Cornish skilled workers and industrial equipment allowed the owners of the Bruce Mines to rapidly scale up mechanization of their operations.

Notable people
 Frank Andrews (1854-after 1890), member of the Nova Scotia House of Assembly
 Elizabeth Arden (1878-1966), businesswoman
 Arthur James Bater (1889-1969), MP for The Battlefords
 Truman Smith Baxter (1867-1931), mayor of Vancouver
 Rick Blight (1955-2005), hockey player
 Marie Bottrell (born 1961), country music singer
 Frederick Buscombe (1862-1938), Mayor of Vancouver
 Dick Cherry (born 1937), hockey player
 Don Cherry (born 1934), hockey player and commentator
 Dean Chynoweth (born 1968), hockey player
 Ed Chynoweth (1941-2008), hockey owner
 H. P. P. Crease (1823-1905), member of the British Columbia Supreme Court
 William Dennis (1856-1920), member of the Senate of Canada
 Claude Ernest Dolman (1906-1994), scientist
 John Eyre (1824-1871), member of the Ontario Legislative Assembly
 Thomas Greenway (1838-1908), Premier of Manitoba
 Wilfred Grenfell (1865-1940), Episcopal missionary
 W.O. Hamley (1818-1907), civil and naval officer
 Derek Holman (born 1931), composer
 Arthur Lobb (1871-1928), member of the Manitoba Legislative Assembly
 Samuel A. Mitchell (1874-1960), astronomer
 R. J. M. Parker (1881-1948), Lieutenant Governor of Saskatchewan
 Robert Parkyn (1862-1939), member of the Alberta Legislative Assembly
 James Pascoe (1863-1931), member of the Saskatchewan Legislative Assembly
 J. Ernest Pascoe (1900-1972), Member of Parliament for Moose Jaw—Lake Centre
 Nigel Pengelly (1925-2010), member of the Alberta Legislative Assembly
 Robert Terrill Rundle (1811-1896), Methodist missionary
 John Teague (1833-1902), architect and mayor of Victoria
 Francis W. Thomas (1834-1900), banker and philanthropist
 John Tucker Williams (1789-1854), naval officer
 Victor Williams (1867-1949), general
 James Yeo. Sr. (1789-1868), member of the Prince Edward Island Legislative Assembly
 James Yeo, Jr. (1827-1903), Member of Parliament for Prince County
 John Yeo (1837-1924), Member of Parliament for East Prince

See also

 English Canadian
 Cornish people#Canada

References

 Encyclopedia of Canada's Peoples. "Cornish.". Multicultural Canada.

Further reading
 Encyclopedia of Canada's Peoples; Paul Robert Magocsi, editor,  University of Toronto Press for Multicultural History Society of Ontario, 1999

 
Canada
English Canadian
European Canadian